Saint-Bonnet-des-Bruyères is a commune in the Rhône department in eastern France.

Geography
The river Grosne has its source in the commune.

See also
Communes of the Rhône department

References

Communes of Rhône (department)
Beaujolais (province)